The 2015 IIHF Inline Hockey World Championship was the 19th IIHF Inline Hockey World Championship, an international inline hockey tournament run by the International Ice Hockey Federation. The World Championship runs alongside the 2015 IIHF Inline Hockey World Championship Division I tournament and took place between 5 and 11 July 2015 in Tampere, Finland. The tournament was won by Canada, earning their third World Championship title. Finland finished in second place and Sweden in third after defeating Slovakia in the bronze medal match. Slovenia, after losing the relegation game against Germany was relegated to Division I for 2017.

Qualification
Seven of the eight teams automatically qualified for the 2015 IIHF Inline Hockey World Championship while the eighth spot was awarded to the winner of the 2014 IIHF Inline Hockey World Championship Division I tournament. The 2014 Division I tournament was won by Slovenia who defeated Australia in the final to earn promotion back to the World Championship after they were relegated in 2013.

 − Finished second in the 2014 World Championship
 − Finished fifth in the 2014 World Championship
 − Finished first in the 2014 World Championship
 − Finished sixth in the 2014 World Championship
 − Finished seventh in the 2014 World Championship
 − Winner of 2014 IIHF Inline Hockey World Championship Division I
 − Finished fourth in the 2014 World Championship
 − Finished third in the 2014 World Championship

Seeding and groups
The seeding in the preliminary round was based on the final standings at the 2014 IIHF Inline Hockey World Championship and 2014 IIHF Inline Hockey World Championship Division I tournaments. The World Championship groups are named Group A and Group B while the 2015 IIHF Inline Hockey World Championship Division I tournament uses Group C and Group D, as both tournaments were held in Tampere, Finland. The teams were grouped accordingly by seeding at the previous year's tournament (in parenthesis is the corresponding seeding):

Group A
 (1)
 (4)
 (5)
 (8)

Group B
 (2)
 (3)
 (6)
 (7)

Preliminary round
Eight participating teams were placed in the following two groups. After playing a round-robin, every team advanced to the Playoff round.

All times are local (UTC+3).

Group A

Group B

Playoff round
All eight teams advanced into the playoff round and were seeded into the quarterfinals according to their result in the preliminary round. The winning quarter finalists advanced through to the semifinals, while the losing teams moved through to the placement round. Slovenia was relegated back to Division I after losing the relegation game against Germany, while the United States finished fifth after defeating Slovenia and the Czech Republic finished sixth following their win over Germany in their placement round games. In the semifinals Finland defeated Slovakia and Canada beat Sweden, both advancing to the gold medal game. After losing the semifinals Slovakia and Sweden played off for the bronze medal with Sweden winning 5–4. Canada defeated Finland 4–2 in the gold medal game, earning their third World Championship title.

All times are local (UTC+3).

Quarterfinals

Classification round

Semifinals

Relegation game

Bronze medal game

Gold medal game

Ranking and statistics

Tournament Awards
Best players selected by the directorate:
Best Goalkeeper:  Vladimir Neumann
Best Defenseman:  Adam Ross
Best Forward:  Jimi Palanto

Final standings
The final standings of the tournament according to IIHF:

Scoring leaders

List shows the top skaters sorted by points, then goals. If the list exceeds 10 skaters because of a tie in points, all of the tied skaters are shown.

Leading goaltenders

Only the top five goaltenders, based on save percentage, who have played at least 40% of their team's minutes are included in this list.

References

External links
World Championship at IIHF.com

IIHF Inline Hockey World Championship
IIHF Inline Hockey World Championship
IIHF InLine Hockey World Championship
IIHF Inline Hockey World Championship
Sports competitions in Tampere
July 2015 sports events in Europe
Inline hockey in Finland